The Waitāhuna River, known until 2019 as Waitahuna River, is a river in the Clutha District of New Zealand, a tributary of the Clutha River.

See also
List of rivers of New Zealand

References

Rivers of Otago
Rivers of New Zealand
Tributaries of the Clutha River